"Satisfied" was the second single released from Squeeze's ninth album, Play, in the UK, and the first in the United States. Although only a promotional radio single was released in the US, the song climbed to #3 on the Modern Rock charts there. In the band's homeland, a full commercial single release failed to chart at all.

Track listing

US Promo CD
 "Satisfied" (4:33)
 "Satisfied (album version)" (5:09)

7" vinyl and cassette
 "Satisfied" (4:33)
 "Happiness Is King" (4:01)

12" vinyl and 5" CD
 "Satisfied" (4:33)
 "Happiness Is King" (4:01)
 "Laughing In My Sleep" (4:07)

External links
Squeeze discography at Squeezenet

Squeeze (band) songs
1991 singles
Songs written by Glenn Tilbrook
Songs written by Chris Difford
1991 songs
Reprise Records singles